Lynda Thalie (born in Oran, Algeria on 25 June 1978) is a Canadian singer-songwriter of Algerian origin. Her family immigrated to Canada and resided in Quebec province since 1994. She has released three albums and has also written her autobiography entitled Survivre aux naufrages published in 2011.

In popular culture
Radio-Canada and RDI picked her as one of 4 Algero-Canadian personalities for its documentary series Mon Algérie et la vôtre. She also visited Algeria for the occasion recounting her experiences of homecoming after so many years.
Her 2009 single "Rallye aicha des Gazelles" is the theme song for the Moroccan Rallye Aicha des Gazelles for the year, a rally event reserved only for women.
In 2010, she took part, alongside many other Canadian artists in Ensemble pour Haïti ("Together for Haiti"), a French Canadian telethon that was held on 22 January 2010 in aid of victims of the 2010 Haiti earthquake.
She has provided vocals for the soundtrack of films by Michel Cusson of Cité-Amérique and the National Film Board of Canada

Appearances 
In 2002, she was featured in Les FrancoFolies de Montréal
In July 2009, she appeared in the Montreal International Jazz Festival
She took part in francophony celebrations in the 2010 Winter Olympics in Vancouver, the 2012 Summer Olympics in London. and francophony in Greece.
She has collaborated with a number of artists and most notably Enrico Macias as she sang with him in Les FrancoFolies de Montréal in Montreal in 2006, opening for him in Place des Arts in Montreal and singing with him in L'Olympia in Paris and in Cairo, Egypt.

Awards and nominations
2000: Laureate at Ma première Place des Arts held at Montreal's Place des Arts, an event for upcoming Quebec artists
2004: Prix du patrimoine d'expression (Québec)
2006: Nominated during ADSIQ awards for "Best World Music Album" for her self-titled album Lynda Thalie
2009: Won "World Music Artist of the Year" award for her general work and "Francophone Album of the Year" for her album La rose des sables during the Sounds of Blackness Awards in Montreal

Personal life
Lynda Thalie never knew her father close, as he had left the family when she was young never to return again. Thalie emigrated to Canada with her mother and brother. She recounts the devastating effect of the loss of her father on her and her family. She also recounts in her autobiographical book Survivre aux naufrages her attempt to commit suicide. She said in an interview that the book in its honesty served as a redeeming experience for her.
Thalie is a mother of twin children Dahlia and Liam

Discography

Albums
2002:  Sablier 
Track list
"Sablier" (4:13)
"L'âge nouveau" (4:24)
"Marsa" (4:35)
"Pour toi" (3:49)
"En équilibre" (4:14)
"Dis-moi, crie-moi" (3:50)
"Alger Alger" (4:06)
"Elle" (4:38)
"Comme un matin à Larabâa" (6:13)
"Marsa (remix)" (6:49)

2005:  Lynda Thalie 
Track list
"En équilibre" (4:26)
"Djouhar" (4:33)
"Kfaya" (4:05)
"Nomade" (5:08)
"Adieu mon pays" (4:17)
"Comme des mortels" (3:53)
"De neige ou de sable" (4:03)
"Collier de jasmin" (3:50)
"Tout ce dont j'ai besoin" (3:09)
"Croire" (4:40)
"Galouli" (3:06)
"Vu du 6ième" (4:33)

2008:  La rose des sables 
Track list
"Une femme amoureuse" (3:34)
"Le rallye des gazelles" (3:57)
"Ana Akida" (4:47)
"Mon amie la rose" (with Florence K.) (4:43)
"La rose des sables" (3:11)
"À nous" (4:05)
"Si je pouvais" (2:59)
"Melilla" (5:23)
"Fais-moi croire" (4:07)
"Mer et monde" (3:45)
"Celle que moi je vois" (5:34)

2013: Nomadia
Track list
 Nomadia (2:52)
 Dance Your Pain Away (La tête haute) (3:25)
 Je l'attends (4:02)
 Merci (3:11)
 1001 (3:54)
 Ne pleure pas (5:28)
 One Drop (4:34)
 Big Bang (3:57)
 Qui m'aime me suive (2:50)
 Mi casa (3:22)

Singles
2009: "Rallye Aicha des Gazelles"
2013: "Dance your pain away (La tête haute)"

Bibliography
2011: Survivre aux naufrages (Éditions La Semaine) (an autobiography of the artist)

Theatre
2004: Le Petit Prince in role of La rose

Notes
Radio Canada presentations – Mon Algérie et la vôtre

References

External links
Official website
Myspace

1978 births
Living people
Algerian emigrants to Canada
People from Oran
Singers from Montreal
21st-century Canadian women singers